Malatipatpur railway station is a railway station on Kharagpur–Puri line in East Coast Railway zone under Khurda Road railway division of Indian Railways. The station is situated beside Puri-Balanga Road at Malatipatapur in Puri district of the Indian state of Odisha.

History
As the branch of Howrah–Chennai main line, the Khurda Road– section was opened to traffic on 1 February 1897. The complete track became doubled in July 2015.

References

Khurda Road railway division
Railway stations in Puri district